Roman Fischer may refer to:

 Roman Fischer (fencer) (born 1915), Austrian fencer
 Roman Fischer (footballer) (born 1983), Czech footballer